Omiodes continuatalis is a species of moth in the family Crambidae. It is endemic to the Hawaiian islands of Kauai, Oahu, Molokai, Maui, Lanai and Hawaii. It was first cited as possibly extinct by W.C. Gagné and Francis Gard Howarth in 1982. It was listed as extinct by the Hawaiʻi Biological Survey in 2002 and the IUCN in 2003, but was rediscovered later in 2003.

The larvae feed on various native and non-native grasses, including Heteropogon contortus and Paspalum conjugatum. The larvae hide among the mass of dead leaves at the base of the tufts of grass and feed on the lowermost accessible green leaves instead of feeding on upper leaves and hiding in a rolled up leaf, as several of the other species of Omiodes. Full-grown larvae are 28–30 mm long and testaceous (reddish yellow) green, with a rosy tinge.

The pupa is formed in a slight cocoon in the same place that the caterpillar used as a retreat. It is 13–15 mm long and very dark brown. The pupal period lasts 12–15 days.

References

Rediscovery of five species of Omiodes Guenée (Lepidoptera: Crambidae) on Hawaiʻi Island

Continuatalis
Endemic moths of Hawaii
Moths described in 1860
Taxonomy articles created by Polbot